Yellowstone is an unincorporated community in the town of Fayette in Lafayette County, Wisconsin, United States.

History
Zenas H. Gurley, Sr. led a branch of the Church of Jesus Christ of Latter Day Saints (Strangite) in the 1850s in Yellowstone.

Notes

Unincorporated communities in Lafayette County, Wisconsin
Unincorporated communities in Wisconsin
Church of Jesus Christ of Latter Day Saints (Strangite)